Ljubo is a South Slavic masculine given name. Notable people with the name include:

Ljubo Babić (1890–1974), Croatian painter
Ljubo Benčić (1905–1992), Croatian and Yugoslav football player
Ljubo Boban (1933–1994), Croatian historian
Ljubo Ćesić Rojs (born 1958), Croatian general and right-wing politician
Ljubo Čupić (1913–1942), Montenegrin communist and war hero
Ljubo Germič (born 1960), Slovenian politician and a member of the Slovenian National Assembly
Ljubo Jurčić (born 1954), Croatian economist and former Croatian Minister of the Economy
Ljubo Savić (born 1958), Bosnian Serb military commander and politician
Ljubo Miličević (born 1981), Australian football (soccer) player
Ljubo Miloš (1919–1948), Croatian World War II official and concentration camp commandant executed for war crimes
Ljubo Sirc CBE (born 1920), British-Slovene economist and famous dissident of the former Yugoslavia
Ljubo Vukić (born 1982), Croatian handball player
Ljubo Wiesner (1885–1951), Croatian poet

See also
Ljubomir

Croatian masculine given names
Serbian masculine given names
Slovene masculine given names
Montenegrin masculine given names